Vysoká u Příbramě is a municipality and village in Příbram District in the Central Bohemian Region of the Czech Republic. It has about 400 inhabitants.

Notable people
Antonín Dvořák (1841–1904), composer; lived and worked here here in summers in 1884–1904

References

Villages in Příbram District